Ten Little Niggers may refer to:

 "Ten Little Indians", a modern children's rhyme, a major variant of which is "Ten Little Niggers"
 And Then There Were None, a 1939 novel by Agatha Christie which was originally published as Ten Little Niggers and later as Ten Little Indians
 And Then There Were None (play), a 1943 play by Agatha Christie adapting her novel, performed in the United Kingdom as Ten Little Niggers
 And Then There Were None (1945 film), released in the UK as Ten Little Niggers
 Desyat Negrityat (Ten Little Niggers/Negroes, Russian: Десять негритят), 1987 Soviet film adaptation

See also
 
 
 And Then There Were None (disambiguation)
 Ten Little Indians (disambiguation)